The South Bank Grand Arbour is a kilometre long arbour located in the South Bank Parklands in Brisbane, Australia. The structure functions as a pedestrian walkway which connects the Griffith Film School on the corner of Dock Street and Vulture Street to the Cultural Forecourt adjacent to QPAC, as well as the rest of the South Bank Parklands through which it runs.

The arbour was designed by Melbourne-based architectural firm Denton Corker Marshall, and was officially opened in 2000. The structure is composed of 443 steel tendrils upon which a bougainvillea canopy is grown.

References

Buildings and structures in Brisbane
Parks in Brisbane